Connor Strachan (born June 30, 1995) is an American football linebacker who is currently a free agent. He played three games for the Houston Texans between December 2021 and January 2022.

College career
Strachan attended Boston College and played 42 games as linebacker with the Boston College Eagles in the Atlantic Coast Conference, between 2014 and 2018. During this period he made 154 solo tackles, 113 assisted tackles, two interceptions, six recovered fumbles and one touchdown.

Professional career
After going undrafted in the 2019 NFL Draft Strachan signed with the Jacksonville Jaguars as an undrafted free agent on April 28. Strachan was cut during final roster cuts. On October 19, 2021, Strachan signed with to the Houston Texans. He played his first game on December 19, 2021 against Jacksonville, his second on December 26 against the Los Angeles Chargers and his third on January 9, 2022 against the Tennessee Titans. The Texans waived Strachan on March 22, 2022.

References

1995 births
Living people
Houston Texans players
Jacksonville Jaguars players
Boston College Eagles football players
American football linebackers